Al-Ahram Weekly is an English-language weekly broadsheet printed by the Al-Ahram Publishing House in Cairo, Egypt.

History and profile
Al Ahram Weekly was established in 1991 by the Al-Ahram newspaper, which also runs a French-language weekly version, Al-Ahram Hebdo.

Between 1991 and 2003, founder Hosni Guindi, served as the editor-in-chief and Hani Shukrallah as managing editor and co-founder Mona Anis as deputy editor-in-chief. After Hosni's  death in 2003, Shukrallah succeeded him as acting editor. In 2005 Egypt's Shura Council appointed Assem El-Qersh as the paper's editor-in-chief, replacing Shukrallah. In June 2014, Galal Nassar was appointed editor-in-chief of the weekly.

The circulation of the magazine in 2000 was 50,000 copies.

See also
 List of magazines in Egypt
Sherif Sonbol, Al Ahram Weekly chief photographer

References

External links

1991 establishments in Egypt
English-language magazines
Magazines established in 1991
Magazines published in Cairo
News magazines published in Africa
Political magazines published in Egypt
Weekly magazines published in Egypt